The 2019 World Under-17 Hockey Challenge is an ice hockey tournament that was held in Swift Current, Saskatchewan and Medicine Hat, Alberta, Canada from November 2 to November 9. The World Under-17 Hockey Challenge is held by Hockey Canada annually to showcase young hockey talent from Canada and other strong hockey countries.

The round-robin and knockout games will be hosted at Innovation Credit Union iPlex in Swift Current and Canalta Centre in Medicine Hat, and the latter will host the bronze and gold medal games.

Final standings

External links
Official Website

U-17
U-17
U-17
U-17
U-17
U-17
World U-17 Hockey Challenge
Ice hockey competitions in Saskatchewan
Ice hockey competitions in Alberta
Swift Current
Medicine Hat